The 2005–06 Slovenian Second League season started on 14 August 2005 and ended on 3 June 2006. Each team played a total of 27 matches.

League standing

See also
2005–06 Slovenian PrvaLiga
2005–06 Slovenian Third League

References
NZS archive

External links
Football Association of Slovenia 

Slovenian Second League seasons
2005–06 in Slovenian football
Slovenia